Scey-Maisières is a commune in the Doubs department in the Bourgogne-Franche-Comté region in eastern France.

Geography

History
The commune was formed from the former communes of Scey-en-Varais and Maisières-Notre-Dame.

Population

See also
 Communes of the Doubs department

References

External links

 Scey-Maisières on the regional Web site 

Communes of Doubs